The Proton CamPro engine is the first flagship automotive engine developed together with Lotus by the Malaysian automobile manufacturer, Proton.

The name CamPro is short for Cam Profiling. This engine powers the Proton Gen-2, Proton Satria Neo, Proton Waja Campro, Proton Persona, Proton Saga, Proton Exora, Proton Preve, Proton Suprima S and Proton Iriz.

The CamPro engine was created to show Proton's ability to make its own engines that produce good power output and meet newer emission standards. The engine prototype was first unveiled on 6 October 2000 at the Lotus factory in UK before it debuted in the 2004 Proton Gen•2.

All CamPro engines incorporate drive-by-wire technology (specifically electronic throttle control) for better response, eliminating the need for friction-generating mechanical linkages and cables.

CamPro technical specifications

Variants

Original CamPro engine 

The first CamPro engine made its debut in 2004 fitted to the newly released Gen•2 models. The S4PH engine was ironically not equipped with Cam Profile Switching (CPS) even though its Campro designation was an abbreviation of Cam Profile Switching. It also lacked the Variable Inlet Manifold (VIM) technology of later CamPro engines. Proton also produced a 1.3-litre version of this original CamPro engine and codenamed it S4PE.

Even though the S4PH engine had contemporary maximum power and torque outputs, its performance was reportedly sluggish in real world driving. This performance deficiency was attributed to a pronounced torque dip in the crucial 2,500 to 3,500 rpm mid engine speed range where torque actually decreased before picking up back to the maximum torque level at 4,000 rpm. This torque characteristic could also clearly be seen in manufacturer published engine performance curves.

This engine also displayed a torque dip in the mid engine speed range, similar to the one in the larger variant.

The bore x stroke dimensions for both engines are as follows:-

 S4PH (1.6L):  x , resulting the displacement of 1,598 cc.
 S4PE (1.3L):  x , resulting the displacement of 1,332 cc.

Applications:
 2004 - 2008 Proton Gen-2
 2006 - 2008 Proton Waja
 2006 – 2009 Proton Satria Neo (Lite & M-Line)
 2007 - 2008 Proton Persona

CamPro CPS and VIM engine 

The CamPro CPS engine uses a variable valve lift system (Cam Profile Switching system) and a variable length intake manifold (VIM; not to be confused with the stand-alone IAFM used in the 2008 Proton Saga) to boost maximum power and improve the CPS engine's torque curve over the original CamPro engine.

The engine's Variable-length Intake Manifold (VIM) switches between a long intake manifold at low engine speeds and a short intake manifold at higher engine speeds. Proton cars use a longer intake manifold to achieve slower air flow; as it was found that promotes better mixing with fuel. The short intake manifold allows more air in faster. This is beneficial at high RPMs.

The Cam Profile Switching (CPS) system uses a tri-lobe camshaft to switch between two different cam profiles. One cam profile provides low valve lift, while the other cam profile has a high valve lift. The low valve lift cam profile is used at low to mid engine speeds to maintain idling quality and reduce emissions, while the high lift cam profile is used when the engine is spinning at mid to high engine speeds improve peak horsepower and torque. Unlike the other similar variable valve timing systems such as the Honda VTEC, the Toyota VVT-i and the Mitsubishi MIVEC which use rocker arm locking pins to change the valve timing, the CPS system uses direct-acting tappets with locking pins to change the valve timing and lift profile.

VIM switches from the long to short runner at 4,800 rpm, while the CPS system switches over at 3,800 rpm (4,400 rpm in the Proton Satria Neo CPS). Proton claims that there is better response and torque at low engine speeds of between 2000 - 2500 rpm.

The new CPS engine first made its debut in the face-lifted Proton Gen•2 launched in Thailand in 2008, and made its first Malaysian debut in the Proton Waja CamPro 1.6 Premium (CPS).

Applications:
 2008 Proton Gen-2 (H-line)
 2008 Proton Waja
 2009 Proton Satria Neo (H-Line)
 2009 Proton Exora
 2010 Proton Gen-2 Facelift (M-Line)

CamPro IAFM engine 

The CamPro IAFM (Intake Air-Fuel Module) is essentially an original CamPro engine equipped with a variable-length intake manifold, developed under a joint fast track programme that began in April 2005 by EPMB, Bosch and Proton. However, the IAFM differs from the VIM (Variable Inlet Manifold) for the CamPro CPS engine as follows:

 The IAFM is a stand-alone module that can be fitted with an original CamPro engine whereas the VIM needs to work in conjunction with the CPS system in a CamPro CPS engine.
 The IAFM is operated by the engine vacuum, while the VIM uses an ECU-controlled solenoid.

The Intake Air-Fuel Module for Proton's CamPro engine debuted in the second-generation Proton Saga, which was launched on 18 January 2008. It was first made known to the public in October 2006, when it was still in its advanced tooling stages.

With the IAFM, the 1.3L engine used in the Proton Saga now produces  @ 6,500rpm.

While the IAFM works great when it was new, the quality of parts are not durable over long term. When the solenoid breaks, the flap can no longer be functional to direct air in the manifold and causes it to produce the infamous 'tak, tak, tak' sound, similar to the noise of tappets while also making it a major vacuum leak to the engine.

The second-generation Campro IAFM engine, known as IAFM+ engine, debuted in the 2011 Proton Saga FLX. The new IAFM+ engine is tweaked to be paired with the new CVT gearbox by Punch Powertrain that requires the maximum operating engine speed to be reduced from the previous 6,500 rpm in the first-generation IAFM engine to only 6,000 rpm. The combination of the new Campro IAFM+ engine with the CVT gearbox results 4% and 10% reduction on fuel consumption for urban and highway driving respectively.

Applications:

 2008 Proton Saga
 2008 Proton Gen-2 (M-line)
 2008 Proton Persona
 2012 Proton Preve

Hybrid CamPro engine 
In March 2007, Proton and Lotus have announced their concept model of a Proton Gen-2 powered by a hybrid powerplant that uses the CamPro engine. The concept model was revealed during the 2007 Geneva Motor Show from 8 ~ 18 March 2007.

The hybrid power-plant system, which is known as EVE system (Efficient, Viable, Environmental) will be using the same S4PH engine as the one that powers the present gasoline version of the Gen•2, combined together with a 30 kW, 144V electric motor. The main purpose of the hybrid powerplant system is to provide a hybrid system that can be retrofitted to existing models, retaining the same power-plant and also eliminating the need to develop a completely different platform, like the Honda Civic Hybrid. Unlike the IMA (Integrated Motor Assist) technology in the Civic Hybrid that uses a bulky Ni-MH battery pack, the EVE Hybrid system will use a Li-ion battery pack inside the engine bay.

The EVE Hybrid System will have 3 key technologies:

 "Micro-hybrid" start-stop system - An integrated starter-alternator system is installed to switch off the engine automatically when the engine stops, for example at a traffic light. The engine will automatically restart when the gas pedal is depressed.
 Full parallel hybrid technology - Combines the existing S4PH engine with a 30 kW, 144V electric motor, resulting in higher power (141 bhp combined), higher torque (233 N-m combined), lower emission (up to 22% carbon dioxide reduction) and better fuel economy (up to 4.6 L/100 km). The system also includes regenerative braking system.
 Continuously Variable Transmission (CVT) - The CVT system provides an infinite number of gear ratios for better efficiency.

The combined power and torque for the power-plant system are as follows:

 Max power (gasoline engine only):  @ 6,000 rpm
 Max torque (gasoline engine only):    @ 4,000 rpm
 Max power (combined):  @ 5,500 rpm
 Max torque (combined):    @ 1,500rpm (limited to  continuous)

Proton will start commercialising their upcoming hybrid vehicles equipped with the EVE Hybrid System in the future.

CamPro CFE engine 
The CFE is the acronym of "Charged Fuel Efficiency".

The idea of the production was first revealed by Proton Managing Director Datuk Syed Zainal Abidin on 13 December 2008, due to the new market trend of having small displacement engine but forced-aspirated to produce the power output equivalent to a larger motor, a similar concept as the Volkswagen TSI twincharger technology and the Ford EcoBoost engine. The finalised engine was debuted during the KLIMS 2010.

To accommodate the increase of engine power, several changes to the technical specification have been done. The compression ratio is reduced to 8.9:1 from the previous 10:1. A variable valve timing mechanism is also added for the intake valves, but it alters the cam phasing and valve opening timing continuously rather than altering the valve lift at a preset engine speed as in the CPS mechanism.

In 2016, a public recall affecting more than 90,000 CamPro CFE equipped vehicles took place for the oil cooler hose. Together with the recall, service intervals for oil cooler hose replacement were lowered to every 40,000 kilometres. The intervals was increased to every 80,000 kilometres following the availability of a higher quality oil cooler hose in 2018 replacing an all rubber component from before with a part rubber, part metal component. 

Applications:

 2012 Proton Exora
 2012 Proton Preve
 2013 Proton Suprima S

VVT engine 
The VVT (Variable Valve Timing) engine was unveiled in September 2014 with its first application in the Proton Iriz. The VVT engine has a new block, new pistons and new valves, and incorporates variable valve timing (VVT). However, some technology in the new VVT family is shared with the old CamPro, but due to the various changes and modifications made to the CamPro family over the past decade, Proton has decided not to use the 'CamPro' nameplate after its 2014 revision. However, older models like the Exora, Prevé and Suprima S will continue to use the old 'CamPro' name until it is eventually retired in favour of the upcoming GDi engines.

The latest application of the VVT engine in the 2016 Proton Persona, 2017 Proton Iriz and Proton Saga features Proton's ECO Drive Assist program. The system assesses the driver's throttle input, and a green indicator on the instrument cluster will light up when the car is being driven in an economical manner.

The VVT engines are like the CFE engines with the VVT for the intake valves.

Applications:

 2014 Proton Iriz
 2016 Proton Persona (equipped only with 1.6 variant)
 2016 Proton Saga (equipped only with 1.3 variant)

Future plans 

Currently, Proton is planning to develop a new engine known as the code name "GDi/TGDi engine" with option of displacement between 1.0/1.2L three cylinders,1.3/1.5 naturally aspirated and turbocharged and progressively 2.0 L, 2.3 L all in the variant of either natural aspirated or in force induction type. The existing CamPro engines which are limited to 1.3-litre and 1.6-litre engine options only will be EOL (End of Life) soon after. The 1.3 and 1.5 turbo slated to churns out 140 hp/210 nm & 180 hp/250 nm respectively.

References

External links 

 

Automobile engines
Proton engines
2004 introductions
2004 establishments in Malaysia
British inventions
Malaysian inventions